Robert Megennis (born March 5, 2000) is an American race car driver who has been active since 2015 starting his career in the F1600, later moving up to the USF2000 series, Pro Mazda, and Indy Lights. He currently races with Andretti Autosport in Indy lights.

Racing record

Career summary

American open–wheel racing results

U.S. F2000 National Championship

Pro Mazda Championship

Indy Lights

Complete European Le Mans Series results
(key) (Races in bold indicate pole position; results in italics indicate fastest lap)

Complete WeatherTech SportsCar Championship results
(key) (Races in bold indicate pole position; races in italics indicate fastest lap)

* Season still in progress.

References

External links
 
 

2000 births
Living people
Racing drivers from New York City
U.S. F2000 National Championship drivers
Indy Pro 2000 Championship drivers
Indy Lights drivers
24 Hours of Daytona drivers

European Le Mans Series drivers
MRF Challenge Formula 2000 Championship drivers
WeatherTech SportsCar Championship drivers
Team Pelfrey drivers
Juncos Hollinger Racing drivers
Andretti Autosport drivers
Michelin Pilot Challenge drivers